Neklyudikha is a rural locality (a village) in Medvedevskoye Rural Settlement, Totemsky  District, Vologda Oblast, Russia. The population was 1 as of 2002.

Geography 
Neklyudikha is located 72 km east of Totma (the district's administrative centre) by road. Kolupaiha is the nearest rural locality.

References 

Rural localities in Tarnogsky District